Çınar is a Turkish surname. The word literally means Platanus tree. The surname may refer to:

 Ateş Çınar (born 1986), Turkish yacht racer
 Deniz Çınar (born 1984), Turkish yacht race
 Erdoğan Çınar, Turkish writer
 İlker Çınar (born c. 1968–1970), former intelligence agent of the Turkish Army
 Nilüfer Çınar Çorlulu (born 1962), Turkish Woman International Master of chess
 Nurhan Çınar (born 1994), Turkish female field hockey player
 Sevgi Çınar (born 1994), Turkish female footballer
 Yıldıray Çınar (born 1976), Turkish comic book artist

See also
 Çınar (disambiguation)

Turkish-language surnames